José Fernando Ferrer Selma (born 28 October 1950 in Castellón de la Plana, Valencian Community) is a Spanish retired footballer who played as a defender.

Honours
Castellón
Segunda División: 1980–81
Copa del Generalísimo: Runner-up 1972–73

External links

1950 births
Living people
Sportspeople from Castellón de la Plana
Spanish footballers
Footballers from the Valencian Community
Association football defenders
La Liga players
Segunda División players
CD Castellón footballers
RCD Espanyol footballers
Levante UD footballers
Spain under-23 international footballers
Spain amateur international footballers